Feast Festival is an LGBTI Festival held annually in the South Australian capital of Adelaide. The event is one of Australia's four major queer festivals, alongside Perth's Pride Festival, Melbourne's Midsumma and the Sydney Gay and Lesbian Mardi Gras.

Feast was founded in  a by group of arts and community cultural workers. Margie Fischer, Damien Carey, Helen Bock and Luke Cutler worked together to create a community arts festival for the lesbian and gay community in Adelaide. In 1999, cabaret theatre performer Paul Capsis performed at the festival's opening concert.

In November 2009, the lineup of singer/songwriters for Sing Out at the festival included Emily Davis, Vicki Bennett, and Ziggie Zertophf. In 2016, Dannii Minogue was the headline act for the opening night street party. In 2011 approximately 48,000 people attended Feast events, with another 40,000 tuning into the live radio broadcast from Picnic in the Park with Joy 94.9.

Financial difficulties
Feast Festival has faced increased financial difficulties in recent years. In 2014, its accumulated deficit more than doubled, from $29,521 in 2013 to $79,175 in 2014. In May 2015, Feast Festival made its Artistic Director, Catherine Fitzgerald, redundant in what was described as part of "a recent review of operational requirements in response to financial constraints". The decision, and subsequent festival, received criticism from the LGBTIQ community, including from the festival co-founder Helen Bock. This left the festival without artistic leadership, to be led by the General Manager, Cassandra Liebeknecht and Chair of the Board, Joshua Rayner. In September 2016, General Manager, Cassandra Liebeknecht was suspended on full pay pending an investigation while the board investigated allegations of unprofessional conduct, and was criticized for incompetence and breaking relationships with arts and LGBTIQ community. She later resigned before the investigation was completed leaving the Festival in a very precarious financial situation.

In 2016 the organisation was "bailed out" by Arts South Australia Executive Director Peter Louca following the "significant unreported losses".

The Festival aims to keep a balance between government funding, business sponsorship, earned income, individual giving and fundraising in supporting its revenue needs for each Festival and currently receives funding support from government as follows:
 South Australian Government through Arts SA and the SA Tourism Commission.
 Local Government through the Adelaide City Council.
A range of sponsors and partners also contribute on an annual basis.

Feast are founder members of the newly formed Festivals Adelaide.

The Feast Festival is sponsored by, amongst others, the Adelaide City Council, South Australian Tourism Commission, Coopers Brewery, Arts SA, Blaze Magazine, and AGL Energy.

See also

List of LGBT events

References

External links
 Feast Festival

1997 establishments in Australia
Festivals in Adelaide
LGBT culture in Adelaide
Pride parades in Australia
Festivals established in 1997